The original West Region was a region that competed in the Little League World Series between  and  until it was split into a Northwest Region and a new West Region in 2001.

The West Region was inaugurated in 1957. The Region consisted of teams from Alaska, Arizona, Northern California, Southern California, Colorado, Hawaii (since 1962), Idaho, Montana, Nevada, New Mexico, Oregon, Utah, Washington, and Wyoming. Before 1962, Hawaiian teams competed in the Pacific Region (see below). Prior to 1966, teams from Western Canada also competed in the West Region.

Little League Baseball expanded the LLWS to sixteen teams for the 2001 Little League World Series. At the same time, the original West Region was split into a new West Region (Arizona, Northern California, Southern California, Hawaii, Nevada, New Mexico, and Utah) and a Northwest Region (Alaska, Colorado, Idaho, Montana, Oregon, Washington, and Wyoming). Colorado and New Mexico moved to the Southwest Region for the 2002 tournament. Between 2002 and 2005, Hawaii competed in the Northwest Region and Wyoming competed in the West Region, before switching back to the original configuration in 2006.

Champions in the West Region (1957–2000)

The following table indicates the West Region champion and its LLWS performance in each year between 1957 and 2000.

Champions in the Pacific Region (1958–1961) 

A team from Hawaii represented the Pacific Region in the Little League World Series between 1958 and 1961. Between 1958 and 1960, the Hawaiian state champions received an automatic berth (as there were no foreign nations in the Pacific Region); in 1961, Hilo American Little League defeated a team from Japan in a playoff for the Pacific Region berth. Starting in 1962, teams from Japan competed in the newly created Far East Region and Hawaii moved to the West Region.

Results by state
Total does not include Hawaii's four appearances representing the Pacific Region (1958–1961) in the tournament. "Italics" indicates team is no longer in region.

References

External links
Little League Online
West Region Historical Results

West (1957-2000)
Defunct baseball competitions in the United States
Sports in the Western United States
Recurring sporting events established in 1957